Debbie (or Debby or Deb) is a feminine given name, commonly but not always short for Deborah (or Debra and related variants).

Debbie is a name of Hebrew origin, derived from the Hebrew name Deborah, which means “bee”.

Notable people

Debbie Allen, American actress, choreographer and film director
Debbie Armstrong, American athlete
Debbie Brill, Canadian high jumper
Debbie Cook, Californian politician, mayor of Huntington Beach, California
Debbie Crosbie (born 1969/1970), British banker
Debbie Fuller, Canadian diver
Debbie Gibson, American singer, songwriter and actress
Debbie Harry, lead singer from the band Blondie
Debbie Marti, English high jumper
Debbie Matenopoulos, American television personality and actress
Debbie McLeod, Scottish field hockey player
Debbie Meyer, American swimmer
Debbie Reynolds, American actress (born Mary Frances Reynolds)
Debby Ryan, American actress
Debbie Muir (born 1953), Canadian former synchronized swimmer and coach
Debbie Stabenow, American legislator
Debbie Turner, actor, Marta von Trapp in 'The Sound of Music'
Debbye Turner, Miss America 1990
Debbie Wasserman Schultz, American legislator

Fictional characters
Debbie Benton, (portrayed by Bambi Woods), the eponymous lead in the film, Debbie Does Dallas
Debbie Dean (portrayed by Jodi Albert), a character in the British soap opera, Hollyoaks
Debbie Dingle (portrayed by Charley Webb), a character in the British soap opera, Emmerdale
Debbie Downer (portrayed by Rachel Dratch), a character on Saturday Night Live
Debbie Edwards (portrayed by Natalie Wood and Lana Wood), character in the film, The Searchers
Debbie Gallagher (portrayed by Rebecca Ryan), one of the lead characters in British television drama, Shameless
Debbie Jellinsky, (portrayed by Joan Cusack), a character from the film Addams Family Values
 Debbie Kang, a minor character from Randy Cunningham: 9th Grade Ninja

Songs
"Debbie" by R. Stevie Moore from the album Everything You Always Wanted To Know About R. Stevie Moore But Were Afraid To Ask
"Debbie," one of two new songs from the B-52s' 1998 compilation album Time Capsule: Songs for a Future Generation
"Debbie character used in the song "1985" by American pop-rock band Bowling for Soup

Other uses
 Tropical Storm Debbie
 Tropical Storm Debby
Debby (polar bear), the world's oldest polar bear

See also
 Deb (disambiguation)
 Debs (disambiguation)
 Debra (disambiguation)
 Deborah (disambiguation)

References

English feminine given names
English-language feminine given names